Wanda Rae Jewell (born June 19, 1954 in Havre, Montana) is an American former sports shooter and Olympic bronze medalist.  At the 1984 Summer Olympics in Los Angeles, California, she won a bronze medal in the women's standard small-bore rifle (three positions at 50 metres).  At the 1988 Summer Olympics, she tied for 13th place in the same event.

References

 

1954 births
Living people
People from Havre, Montana
Sportspeople from Montana
American female sport shooters
United States Distinguished Marksman
ISSF rifle shooters
Shooters at the 1984 Summer Olympics
Shooters at the 1988 Summer Olympics
Olympic bronze medalists for the United States in shooting
Medalists at the 1984 Summer Olympics
Pan American Games medalists in shooting
Pan American Games gold medalists for the United States
Pan American Games silver medalists for the United States
Pan American Games bronze medalists for the United States
Shooters at the 1983 Pan American Games
Medalists at the 1983 Pan American Games
21st-century American women
20th-century American women